Nepal national under-23 football team, also known as Nepal under-23s or Nepal U23(s), represents Nepal in association football at national and olympic games and is controlled by ANFA, the governing body for football in Nepal, and the Nepal Olympic Committee.

History

Home stadium

The team's home ground is the Dasarath Rangasala Stadium, a multi-purpose stadium in Tripureswor, Kathmandu, Nepal. Holding 25,000 spectators, of which 5.000 seated, it is the biggest stadium in Nepal. It is named after Dashrath Chand, one of the martyrs of Nepal.

Most recently, the stadium was used as a primary venue for the 2012 AFC Challenge Cup and the 2013 SAFF Championship, with the Halchowk Stadium hosting some of the matches as well.

Apart from sporting events, the stadium is also used as a music venue for cultural events with Bryan Adams being the most notable act that performed at the site.

Prior to the 2013 SAFF Championship in Nepal, the Dasarath Rangasala underwent heavy renovation that saw several improvements such as the expansion of seats from 20,000 to 25,000.

Recent results and fixtures

2010s 
Results accurate up to 10 December 2019.

2000s 

* Nepal score always listed first

Competition history
Olympic football events at U-23 level came into effect during the 1992 Summer Olympics, 2002 Asian Games, and the 2004 South Asian Games.
*Denotes draws include knockout matches decided on penalty kicks.
**Red border color indicates tournament was held on home soil.

Olympic Games

* Nepal score always listed first

Current squad

The following players were called up for the 2020 AFC U-23 Championship qualification on 15 March 2019.

Competition history
Olympic football events at U-23 level came into effect during the 1992 Summer Olympics, 2002 Asian Games, and the 2004 South Asian Games.
*Denotes draws include knockout matches decided on penalty kicks.
**Red border color indicates tournament was held on home soil.

Olympic Games

AFC U-23 Championship

Asian Games

South Asian Games

See also
 All Nepal Football Association
 Nepal national football team
 Nepal national under-17 football team
 Nepal national under-20 football team

References

Asian national under-23 association football teams
under-23